A list of the most notable films produced in Bulgaria during the 1990s ordered by year  of release. For an alphabetical list of articles on Bulgarian films see :Category:Bulgarian films.

List

1990

1991

1992

1993

1994

1995

1996

1997

1998

1999

References
 
 The Internet movie database

1990s
Films
Bulgaria